Atocion rupestre, the rock campion, is a plant species of the genus Atocion, native to Europe.

References

Caryophyllaceae
Plants described in 2000